Blueberry Mountain may refer to:
 Blueberry Mountain, Alberta, Canada
 Blueberry Mountain (Oxford County, Maine)